Fotografie der Gegenwart (Photography of the Present) was a photographic exhibition which was one of most important between-the-wars photographic exhibitions, particularly for its inclusion of so many artists associated with the Bauhaus/Expressionist movements.

The event was a Who's Who of Mitteleuropa photography of the period. The show was organised and curated by the art historian .

The exhibition Fotografie der Gegenwart was first shown from 20 January to 17 February 1929 at Museum Folkwang in Essen and then at the Kestner-Gesellschaft in Hannover, 10 March  1929 – 17 April 1929; Galerie Neumann-Nierendorf in Berlin, 20 April 1929 – 20 May 1929; Lichthof des Neuen Rathauses in Dresden, 15 September  1929 – 6 October 1929; Ausstellungsgebäude am Adolf-Mittag-See, Magdeburg, 28 November 1929 – 19 December 1929; and the Whitechapel Gallery in London in 1929 and later at five additional venues.

Stylistic influence
German designer Walter Dexel (1890–1973) designed all the publicity material for the exhibition with Paul Renner’s Futura font. The poster for the event in Magdeburg was produced using linocut.

Participants

Berenice Abbott, Paris
Carl Albiker, Berlin
Eugène Atget, Paris
Herbert Bayer, Berlin
Aenne Biermann, Gera
Karl Blossfeldt, Berlin
Hilde Brinkmann-Schröder, Braunschweig
Mario von Bucovich, Berlin
Max Burchartz, Essen
Marliese Brunne, Berlin
Werner Cohnitz, Munich
Erich Comeriner, Berlin
Sammlung Raoul Corty, Vienna
Wanda von Debschitz-Kunowski, Berlin
Willi Eidenbenz, Magdeburg
Hugo Erfurth, Dresden
Andreas Feininger, Berlin
T. Lux Feininger, Berlin
Hans Feidler, Dresden
, Halle
F. A. Flachslander, Berlin
Johann Graf, Magdeburg
, Hanover
John Heartfield, Berlin
Elisabeth Heddenhausen, Berlin
Kurt Hergé, Naumburg
Florence Henri, Paris
, Görlitz
Emil Otto Hoppé, London
F. Kautz, Essen
André Kertész, Paris
Kleinschmidt, Magdeburg
Rudolf Kramer, Dresden
Germaine Krull, Paris
Helmar Lerski, Berlin
Eli Lotar, Berlin
Alb. Leon, Lutzel-Gelnhausen
Man Ray, Paris
Anton Meinholz, Essen
László Moholy-Nagy and Lucia Moholy, Berlin
Aenne Mosbacher, Kassel
 Oscar and Alice Nerlinger, Berlin
Heinz von Perckhammer, Berlin
Walter Peterhans, Berlin
, Berlin
Albert Renger-Patzsch, Berlin
Hans Richter (artist), Berlin
, Dresden
Frieda Gertrud Riess, Berlin
, Dresden
August Sander, Cologne
Kurt Schwitters, Hanover
Gerty Simon, Berlin
Sasha Stone and Cami Stone, Berlin
UMBO – Otto Umbehr, Berlin
K.O. Vogelsang, Berlin
Vohleitner, Magdeburg
Friedrich Vordemberger-Gildewart, Hanover
, Berlin
, Munich
Dr Weller, Berlin
H. Windisch, Berlin
, Frankfurt am Main

References

External links
Fotografie der Gegenwart – list of artists, artist-info.com

Art exhibitions in Germany
Photography exhibitions
1929 in Germany
1929 in art